The 2013 Cleveland Indians season was the 113th season for the franchise. The team, managed by Terry Francona, began their season on April 2. They advanced to the postseason and lost to the Tampa Bay Rays in the 2013 American League Wild Card Game.

Offseason

Departures
Infielder Brent Lillibridge refused assignment and became a free agent on November 25, 2012. The Indians did not tender contracts to infielder Jack Hannahan, Rafael Perez and Chris Seddon, making them free agents. All three went on to sign with other clubs. In a three-team trade on December 11, the Indians traded Shin-Soo Choo, Jason Donald, Tony Sipp and Lars Anderson.

Arrivals
Following the firing of three-year manager Manny Acta, the Indians signed former Boston Red Sox manager, Terry Francona to a four-year deal on October 6, 2012. Francona and Sandy Alomar Jr. were the only candidates for the position. Francona previously had a history with the Cleveland Indians as a front office advisor in 2001. Also, Francona and his dad, Tito, both played in the Major Leagues for the Indians. He stated that he is close with Indians president, Mark Shapiro and general manager, Chris Antonetti and that's what intrigued him the most.

On November 2, Blake Wood was claimed off waivers from Kansas City. The next day, Mike Avilés and Yan Gomes were acquired in a trade with Toronto.  Mike McDade was also claimed off waivers from Toronto about a month later. On December 9, the Indians signed Mark Reynolds to a one-year, $6 million contract. Two days later, the Indians made their biggest trade of the offseason. They acquired Drew Stubbs from Cincinnati and Trevor Bauer, Bryan Shaw, and Matt Albers from Arizona. In one of the biggest signings of the offseason, the Indians signed Nick Swisher to a four-year, $56 million on December 23. Brett Myers agreed to a 1-year, $7 million deal January 1, 2013. After signing Michael Bourn to a four-year $48 million contract, the Indians finished the offseason with spending $117 million on free agents after spending just $8 million the past two seasons.

The busy offseason left many fans and writers saying the Indians will be the most improved team in 2013 and "if there was an offseason championship, the trophy would be heading to Cleveland".

Spring training
On November 29, the Indians announced their spring training schedule. Pitchers and catchers reported to spring training on February 10, 2013. The first full team workout took place on February 15 and the first game took place on February 22 against the Cincinnati Reds.

Injuries
Michael Brantley was accidentally spiked by Oakland Athletics third basemen Josh Donaldson on February 25 at spring training. He received 15 stitches and was expected to be out 10 days. Chris Perez also sprained his shoulder during spring training and was expected to be out three to four weeks. The Indians had several players on the disabled list (DL) to start the season; Frank Herrmann, Blake Wood and Josh Tomlin started the season on the 60-day DL after having Tommy John surgery.

Regular season
The Indians started the regular season in Toronto against the Blue Jays on April 2. Their home opener, which was on April 8, sold out in 6 minutes; one of the fastest sell outs in Indians history.

Opening Day Starting Lineup
 CF Michael Bourn
 SS Asdrúbal Cabrera
 2B Jason Kipnis
 1B Nick Swisher
 LF Michael Brantley
 C Carlos Santana
 DH Mark Reynolds
 3B Lonnie Chisenhall
 RF Drew Stubbs

SP Justin Masterson

April
For the second straight year, the Indians opened the season against the Toronto Blue Jays, this time in Toronto.  Unlike the 2012 opener, the Indians won the game 4–1 with ace Justin Masterson going eight dominant innings and closer Chris Perez picking up the save.  Despite this win, the Tribe started the season slowly, at just 8–13.  The Indians' struggles during April included a crushing 11–6 defeat by the New York Yankees in the team's home opener, and a 3-game sweep at the hands of the Boston Red Sox.

The Indians' fortunes turned around late in the month.  Beginning with the second game of an April 28 doubleheader against the Kansas City Royals, the Indians won six straight games and 18 of 22 going through the middle of May.  On April 30, the Indians tied a team record with seven home runs in a game, as they defeated the Philadelphia Phillies 14–2.

May
The Indians started May on a high note, winning 15 of their first 19 games of the month.  This included four-game sweeps of the defending AL West champion Oakland Athletics and the Seattle Mariners, the latter of which featuring three walk-off hits.  After the Seattle series, however, the Indians struggled for the rest of the month and into early June, losing 16 of their next 20, including a May 26 loss to the Boston Red Sox, in which the Indians blew a 5–2 9th inning lead and closer Chris Perez left the game with a shoulder injury.  Perez would be out until late June.

During April and May, the Indians defeated seven former Cy Young Award winners:  R. A. Dickey (April 2), David Price (April 7), Roy Halladay (April 30), Cliff Lee (May 1), Bartolo Colón (May 9), Justin Verlander (May 11), and Félix Hernández (May 19).  Also, slugger Mark Reynolds was among the league leaders with 14 home runs at the end of May.

June
June started slowly for the Indians as they lost eight straight games from June 2–10.  After that losing streak, however, the Indians would go 14–5 the rest of the month.  Vinnie Pestano filled the role of closer as Chris Perez was on the disabled list for most of the month.

Second baseman Jason Kipnis was named the American League Player of the Month for June.  During the month, he hit .419 with 12 doubles, four home runs, and 25 RBI.  He also stole nine bases and received Player of the Week honors twice during June.

July
on July 6, second baseman Jason Kipnis and starting pitcher Justin Masterson were named to the American League All-Star team.  This marked the first All-Star selection for both Kipnis and Masterson.  Kipnis had an RBI double in the game, as the American League won 3–0.

The Indians started July by losing 5 of 7 to division rivals Kansas City and Detroit, before finishing the first half on a strong note, taking five of six from Toronto and Kansas City.  Late July was highlighted by an eight-game winning streak, which included sweeps of the then AL West leading Texas Rangers and the Chicago White Sox.

The sweep of Chicago was the Tribe's second four-game sweep over the White Sox of the season, marking the first time since 1960 that the Indians swept two four-game series from the same club.  On the July 29 win over the White Sox, slugger Jason Giambi became the oldest player ever to hit a walk-off home run at 42 years and 202 days.  Chris Perez regained his closing duties in July and saved eight games.  Meanwhile, late reliever Vinnie Pestano had struggled throughout the month and was sent to AAA Columbus on July 31.

August
On August 5, the Indians began a key four-game home series against the Detroit Tigers just three games behind Detroit for the division lead.  Taking a 2–0 lead into the 9th inning of game 1, Chris Perez gave up four runs en route to a 4–2 loss.  The Tigers ended up sweeping the series and leaving Cleveland with a 7-game lead.  The Indians went on to lose their next two games – to the Los Angeles Angels of Anaheim – and were in danger of finishing their homestand 0–7, which would be their first winless homestand since 2004.  They managed to win that final game 6–5 after trailing 5–0.

The team's struggles continued throughout the month, as they finished August 12–16, their worst month of the season.  The Indians lost their final 5 games of the month to playoff contenders Atlanta and Detroit.

September

On September 1, the Indians salvaged their final game of the season against Detroit, 4–0 on a Mike Avilés grand slam, but the Tigers won the season series 15–4 and had a commanding lead in the division.  The next day, all-star starter Justin Masterson left the game against the Baltimore Orioles with an oblique injury.  The Indians lost that game and sat 3 games out of a wild card spot without their top pitcher.

Indians #2 starter Ubaldo Jiménez stepped up in Masterson's absence, going 4–0 with a 1.09 ERA during the month of September.  He was named American League Pitcher of the Month.  The Indians played some of their best baseball of the season in September, going 21–6 in the month including a 10-game winning streak to close the season.  Throughout the month, the Indians closed the gap on the Texas Rangers and Tampa Bay Rays, and took the lead for one of the wild card spots with about a week left in the regular season.  The Indians needed this strong month to clinch a Wild Card spot, as they were not able to clinch until the final game of the season, a 5–1 victory over the division rival Twins.  The Indians finished the season 92–70, which was good enough for the top wild card spot, which meant they would host the 2013 American League Wild Card Game at Progressive Field.  This was the Indians' first playoff appearance since 2007.  They finished one game better than both Texas and Tampa Bay, who would face off in a tie-breaker game.  Tampa Bay won this game, and the Wild Card playoff was set.

Also of note during the month, the Indians swept the Chicago White sox in a four-game series for the third time this season, a first in franchise history and the first time since 1963 that any team accomplished this feat.  The Indians finished the season 17–2 against the White Sox.  On September 24, Jason Giambi hit a walk-off home run against the White Sox, again becoming the oldest player ever to hit a walk-off home run at 42 years and 259 days, breaking the record he set less than two months earlier.

Season standings

American League Central

American League Wild Card

Record vs. Opponents

Detailed records

Roster

Game log

|- style="background:#bfb;"
| 1 || April 2 || @ Blue Jays || 4–1 || Masterson (1–0) || Dickey (0–1) || Perez (1) || 48,857 || 1–0 ||W1
|- style="background:#bfb;"
| 2 || April 3 || @ Blue Jays || 3–2 (11) || Albers (1–0) || Santos (0–1) || Smith (1) || 24,619 || 2–0 ||W2
|- style="background:#fbb;"
| 3 || April 4 || @ Blue Jays || 8–10 || Delabar (1–0) || Myers (0–1) || Janssen (1) || 19,515 || 2–1 ||L1
|- style="background:#fbb;"
| 4 || April 5 || @ Rays || 0–4 || Moore (1–0) || McAllister (0–1) || — || 16,019 || 2–2 ||L2
|- style="background:#fbb;"
| 5 || April 6 || @ Rays || 0–6 || Cobb (1–0) || Bauer (0–1) || — || 32,217 || 2–3 ||L3
|- style="background:#bfb;"
| 6 || April 7 || @ Rays || 13–0 || Masterson (2–0) || Price (0–1) || — || 21,629 || 3–3 ||W1
|- style="background:#fbb;"
| 7 || April 8 || Yankees || 6–11 || Kuroda (1–1) || Jiménez (0–1) || — || 41,567 || 3–4 ||L1
|- style="background:#fbb;"
| 8 || April 9 || Yankees || 1–14 || Pettitte (2–0) || Carrasco (0–1) || — || 12,663 || 3–5 ||L2
|- style="background:#bbb;"
|  || April 10 || Yankees || colspan=7| Postponed (rain). Makeup: May 13 (Game 1)
|- style="background:#bbb;"
|  || April 11 || Yankees || colspan=7| Postponed (rain). Makeup: May 13 (Game 2)
|- style="background:#bfb;"
| 9 || April 12 || White Sox || 1–0 || Masterson (3–0) || Crain (0–1) || — || 11,864 || 4–5 ||W1
|- style="background:#bfb;"
| 10 || April 13 || White Sox || 9–4 || McAllister (1–1) || Sale (1–1) || — || 11,422 || 5–5 ||W2
|- style="background:#fbb;"
| 11 || April 14 || White Sox || 1–3 || Peavy (2–1) || Myers (0–2) || Reed (4) || 11,682 || 5–6 ||L1
|- style="background:#fbb;"
| 12 || April 16 || Red Sox || 2–7 || Doubront (1–0) || Jiménez (0–2) || — || 9,143 || 5–7 ||l2
|- style="background:#fbb;"
| 13 || April 17 || Red Sox || 3–6 || Aceves (1–0) || Masterson (3–1) || Bailey (1) || 10,282 || 5–8 ||L3
|- style="background:#fbb;"
| 14 || April 18 || Red Sox || 3–6 || Lester (3–0) || McAllister (1–2) || Bailey (2) || 12,936 || 5–9 ||L4
|- style="background:#fbb;"
| 15 || April 19 || @ Astros || 2–3 || Harrell (1–2) || Myers (0–3) || Veras (1) || 17,241 || 5–10 ||L5
|- style="background:#bfb;"
| 16 || April 20 || @ Astros || 19–6 || Kluber (1–0) || Humber (0–4) ||   || 19,904 || 6–10 ||W1
|- style="background:#bfb;"
| 17 || April 21 || @ Astros || 5–4 || Allen (1–0) || Ambriz (0–1) || Perez (2) || 22,005 || 7–10 ||W2
|- style="background:#bfb;"
| 18 || April 22 || @ White Sox || 3–2 || Masterson (4–1) || Thornton (0–1) || Perez (3) || 14,950 || 8–10 ||W3
|- style="background:#bbb;"
|  || April 23 || @ White Sox || colspan=7| Postponed (rain). Makeup: June 28 (Game 1)
|- style="background:#fbb;"
| 19 || April 24 || @ White Sox || 2–3 || Quintana (2–0) || McAllister (1–3) || Reed (6) || 16,765 || 8–11 ||L1
|- style="background:#bbb;"
| || April 26 || @ Royals || colspan=7| Postponed (rain). Makeup: April 28 (Game 2)
|- style="background:#fbb;"
| 20 || April 27 || @ Royals || 2–3 || Santana (3–1) || Kazmir (0–1) || Holland (6) || 19,224 || 8–12 ||L2
|- style="background:#fbb;"
| 21 || April 28 || @ Royals || 0–9 || Guthrie (3–0) || Masterson (4–2) || — || 22,001 || 8–13 ||L3
|- style="background:#bfb;"
| 22 || April 28 || @ Royals || 10–3 || Kluber (2–0) || Smith (0–1) || — || 19,831 || 9–13 ||W1
|- style="background:#bfb;"
| 23 || April 29 || @ Royals || 9–0 || Jiménez (1–2) || Davis (2–2) || — || 14,255 || 10–13 ||W2
|- style="background:#bfb;"
| 24 || April 30 || Phillies || 14–2 || McAllister (2–3) || Halladay (2–3) || — || 10,841 || 11–13 ||W3
|-

|-  style=text-align:center; bgcolor="#bbffbb"
| 25 || May 1 || Phillies || 6–0  || Bauer (1–1) || Lee (2–2) || || 12,730 || 12–13
|-  style=text-align:center; bgcolor="#bbffbb"
| 26 || May 3 || Twins || 7–6  (10) || Perez (1–0) || Fien (1–2) || || 20,200 || 13–13
|-  style=text-align:center; bgcolor="#bbffbb"
| 27 || May 4 || Twins || 7–3  || Kazmir (1–1) || Correia (3–2) || || 17,830 || 14–13
|-  style=text-align:center; bgcolor="#ffbbbb"
| 28 || May 5 || Twins || 4–2  || Pelfrey (3–3) || Kluber (2–1) || Perkins (7) || 14,015 || 14–14
|-  style=text-align:center; bgcolor="#bbffbb"
| 29 || May 6 || Athletics || 7–3  || Jiménez (2–2) || Parker (1–5) || || 9,514 || 15–14
|-  style=text-align:center; bgcolor="#bbffbb"
| 30 || May 7 || Athletics || 1–0  || McAllister (3–3) || Milone (3–4) || Perez (4) || 9,474 || 16–14
|-  style=text-align:center; bgcolor="#bbffbb"
| 31 || May 8 || Athletics || 4–3  || Masterson (5–2) || Griffin (3–3) || Perez (5) || 11,125 || 17–14
|-  style=text-align:center; bgcolor="#bbffbb"
| 32 || May 9 || Athletics || 9–2  || Kazmir (2–1) || Colón (3–2) || || 12,477 || 18–14
|-  style=text-align:center; bgcolor="#ffbbbb"
| 33 || May 10 || @ Tigers || 10–4 || Scherzer (5–0) || Kluber (2–2) || || 37,547 || 18–15
|-  style=text-align:center; bgcolor="#bbffbb"
| 34 || May 11 || @ Tigers ||7–6 || Jiménez (3–2) || Verlander (4–3) || Perez (6) || 41,438 || 19–15
|-  style=text-align:center; bgcolor="#bbffbb"
| 35 || May 12 || @ Tigers || 4–3  (10) || Smith (1–0) || Downs (0–1) || Allen (1) || 35,260 || 20–15
|-  style=text-align:center; bgcolor="#bbffbb"
| 36 || May 13 || Yankees || 1–0  || Masterson (6–2) || Phelps (1–2) || || — || 21–15
|-  style=text-align:center; bgcolor="#ffbbbb"
| 37 || May 13 || Yankees || 7–0  || Nuño (1–0) || Bauer (1–2) || Warren (1) || 23,299 || 21–16
|-  style=text-align:center; bgcolor="#ffbbbb"
| 38 || May 14 || @ Phillies || 6–2  || Pettibone (3–0) || Kazmir (2–2) || || 39,689 || 21–17
|-  style=text-align:center; bgcolor="#bbffbb"
| 39 || May 15 || @ Phillies || 10–4 || Kluber (3–2) || Hamels (1–6) || || 38,440 || 22–17
|-  style=text-align:center; bgcolor="bbffbb"
| 40 || May 17 || Mariners || 6–3  (10) || Pestano (1–0) || Luetge (0–1) || || 34,282 || 23–17
|-  style=text-align:center; bgcolor="bbffbb"
| 41 || May 18 || Mariners || 5–4  || Perez (2–0) || Pérez (1–1) || || 17,574 || 24–17
|-  style=text-align:center; bgcolor="bbffbb"
| 42 || May 19 || Mariners || 6–0  || Masterson (7–2) || Hernández (5–3) || || 19,744 || 25–17
|-  style=text-align:center; bgcolor="bbffbb"
| 43 || May 20 || Mariners || 10–8 (10) || Smith (2–0) || Furbush (0–3) || || 19,390 || 26–17
|-  style=text-align:center; bgcolor="#ffbbbb"
| 44 || May 21 || Tigers || 5–1  || Scherzer (6–0) || Kluber (3–3) || || 17,374 || 26–18
|-  style=text-align:center; bgcolor="#ffbbbb"
| 45 || May 22 || Tigers || 11–7 || Verlander (5–4) || Jiménez (3–3) || || 16,562 || 26–19
|-  style=text-align:center; bgcolor="bbffbb"
| 46 || May 23 || @ Red Sox || 12–3 || McAllister (4–3) || Dempster (2–5) || Barnes (1) || 35,254 || 27–19
|-  style=text-align:center; bgcolor="#ffbbbb"
| 47 || May 24 || @ Red Sox || 8–1  || Lackey (3–4) || Masterson (7–3) || || 34,074 || 27–20
|-  style=text-align:center; bgcolor="#ffbbbb"
| 48 || May 25 || @ Red Sox || 7–4  || Tazawa (4–2) || Pestano (1–1) || Bailey (6) || 36,504 || 27–21
|-  style=text-align:center; bgcolor="#ffbbbb"
| 49 || May 26 || @ Red Sox || 6–5  || Breslow (2–0) || Perez (2–1) || || 37,046 || 27–22
|-  style=text-align:center; bgcolor="#ffbbbb"
| 50 || May 27 || @ Reds || 4–2  || Broxton (2–1) || Hagadone (0–1) || Chapman (13) || 38,822 || 27–23
|-  style=text-align:center; bgcolor="#ffbbbb"
| 51 || May 28 || @ Reds || 8–2  || Latos (5–0) || McAllister (4–4) || || 28,812 || 27–24
|-  style=text-align:center; bgcolor="#bbffbb"
| 52 || May 29 || Reds || 5–2  || Masterson (8–3) || Arroyo (5–5) || || 18,004 || 28–24
|-  style=text-align:center; bgcolor="#bbffbb"
| 53 || May 30 || Reds || 7–1  || Kazmir (3–2) || Bailey (3–4) || || 18,364 || 29–24
|-  style=text-align:center; bgcolor="#ffbbbb"
| 54 || May 31 || Rays || 9–2  || Wright (1–1) || Barnes (0–1) || Ramos (1) || 29,603 || 29–25
|-

|-  style=text-align:center; bgcolor="#bbffbb"
| 55 || June 1 || Rays || 5–0  || Jiménez (4–3) || Archer (0–1) || || 22,748 || 30–25
|-  style=text-align:center; bgcolor="#ffbbbb"
| 56 || June 2 || Rays || 11–3 || Hellickson (3–2) || McAllister (4–5) || || 18,106 || 30–26
|-  style=text-align:center; bgcolor="#ffbbbb"
| 57 || June 3 || @ Yankees || 7–4  || Kelley (3–0) || Masterson (8–4) || || 40,007 || 30–27
|-  style=text-align:center; bgcolor="#ffbbbb"
| 58 || June 4 || @ Yankees || 4–3  || Phelps (4–3) || Kazmir (3–3) || Rivera (21) || 36,208 || 30–28
|-  style=text-align:center; bgcolor="#ffbbbb"
| 59 || June 5 || @ Yankees || 6–4  || Sabathia (6–4) || Kluber (3–4) || || 42,477 || 30–29
|-  style=text-align:center; bgcolor="#ffbbbb"
| 60 || June 7 || @ Tigers || 7–5  || Verlander (8–4) || Jiménez (4–4) || || 39,008 || 30–30
|-  style=text-align:center; bgcolor="#ffbbbb"
| 61 || June 8 || @ Tigers || 6–4  || Porcello (3–3) || Carrasco (0–2) || Valverde (8) || 41,691 || 30–31
|-  style=text-align:center; bgcolor="#ffbbbb"
| 62 || June 9 || @ Tigers || 4–1  || Alvarez (1–0) || Masterson (8–5) || Benoit (3) || 41,262 || 30–32
|-  style=text-align:center; bgcolor="#ffbbbb"
| 63 || June 10 || @ Rangers || 6–3  || Ross (3–1) || Kazmir (3–4) || Nathan (20) || 33,003 || 30–33
|-  style=text-align:center; bgcolor="#bbffbb"
| 64 || June 11 || @ Rangers || 5–2  || Kluber (4–4) || Holland (5–3) || || 45,200 || 31–33
|-  style=text-align:center; bgcolor="#bbffbb"
| 65 || June 12 || @ Rangers || 5–2  || Jiménez (5–4) || Tepesch (3–6) || || 34,248 || 32–33
|-  style=text-align:center; bgcolor="bbffbb"
| 66 || June 14 || Nationals || 2–1  || Smith (3–0) || Abad (0–1) || || 30,824 || 33–33
|-  style=text-align:center; bgcolor="ffbbbb"
| 67 || June 15 || Nationals || 7–6  || Storen (1–1) || Pestano (1–2) || Soriano (18) || 33,307 || 33–34
|-  style=text-align:center; bgcolor="bbffbb"
| 68 || June 16 || Nationals || 2–0  || Kluber (5–4) || Strasburg (3–6) || Pestano (1) || 21,845 || 34–34
|-  style=text-align:center; bgcolor="ffbbbb"
| 69 || June 17 || Royals || 2–1  || Crow (3–2) || Shaw (0–1) || Holland (15) || 12,803 || 34–35
|-  style=text-align:center; bgcolor="bbffbb"
| 70 || June 18 || Royals || 4–3  || Allen (2–0) || Herrera (3–5) || Pestano (2) || 14,853 || 35–35
|-  style=text-align:center; bgcolor="bbffbb"
| 71 || June 19 || Royals || 6–3  || Masterson (9–5) || Mendoza (2–4) || || 17,349 || 36–35
|-  style=text-align:center; bgcolor="bbffbb"
| 72 || June 21 || Twins || 5–1  || Kazmir (4–4) || Deduno (3–2) || || 26,442 || 37–35
|-  style=text-align:center; bgcolor="bbffbb"
| 73 || June 22 || Twins || 8–7  || Kluber (6–4) || Walters (2–3) || Pestano (3) || 21,417 || 38–35
|-  style=text-align:center; bgcolor="ffbbbb"
| 74 || June 23 || Twins || 5–3  || Hernández (3–1) || Carrasco (0–3) || Perkins (19) || 17,143 || 38–36
|-  style=text-align:center; bgcolor="#bbffbb"
| 75 || June 24 || @ Orioles || 5–2  || Jiménez (6–4) || Britton (1–2) || Pestano (4) || 18,544 || 39–36
|-  style=text-align:center; bgcolor="ffbbbb"
| 76 || June 25 || @ Orioles || 6–3  || Tillman (9–2) || Masterson (9–6) || Johnson (27) || 20,924 || 39–37
|-  style=text-align:center; bgcolor="#bbffbb"
| 77 || June 26 || @ Orioles || 4–3  || Smith (4–0) || Johnson (2–6) || Pestano (5) || 18,082 || 40–37
|-  style=text-align:center; bgcolor="ffbbbb"
| 78 || June 27 || @ Orioles || 7–3  || González (6–3) || Kluber (6–5) || || 33,036 || 40–38
|-  style=text-align:center; bgcolor="#bbffbb"
| 79 || June 28 || @ White Sox || 19–10 || Albers (2–0) || Omogrosso (0–2) || || — || 41–38
|-  style=text-align:center; bgcolor="#bbffbb"
| 80 || June 28 || @ White Sox || 9–8  || Langwell (1–0) || Reed (3–1) || Pestano (6) || 28,628 || 42–38
|-  style=text-align:center; bgcolor="#bbffbb"
| 81 || June 29 || @ White Sox || 4–3  || Martinez (1–0) || Crain (2–3) || Perez (7) || 26,289 || 43–38
|-  style=text-align:center; bgcolor="#bbffbb"
| 82 || June 30 || @ White Sox || 4–0  || Masterson (10–6) || Sale (5–7) || || 27,032 || 44–38
|-

|-  style=text-align:center; bgcolor="#bbffbb"
| 83 || July 2 || @ Royals || 6–5  || Allen (3–0) || Collins (2–3) || Perez (8) || 15,625 || 45–38
|-  style=text-align:center; bgcolor="#ffbbbb"
| 84 || July 3 || @ Royals || 6–5  || Smith (1–1) || Allen (3–1) || Holland (18) || 28,534 || 45–39
|-  style=text-align:center; bgcolor="#ffbbbb"
| 85 || July 4 || @ Royals || 10–7 || Hochevar (2–1) || Shaw (0–2) || Holland (19) || 16,792 || 45–40
|-  style=text-align:center; bgcolor="#ffbbbb"
| 86 || July 5 || Tigers || 7–0  || Porcello (5–6) || Masterson (10–7) || || 40,167 || 45–41
|-  style=text-align:center; bgcolor="#ffbbbb"
| 87 || July 6 || Tigers || 9–4  || Sánchez (7–5) || Carrasco (0–4) || || 28,054 || 45–42
|-  style=text-align:center; bgcolor="#bbffbb"
| 88 || July 7 || Tigers || 9–6  || Allen (4–1) || Alburquerque (1–2) || Perez (9) || 20,503 || 46–42
|-  style=text-align:center; bgcolor="#ffbbbb"
| 89 || July 8 || Tigers || 4–2  (10) || Smyly (4–0) || Albers (2–1) || Benoit (7) || 23,640 || 46–43
|-  style=text-align:center; bgcolor="#bbffbb"
| 90 || July 9 || Blue Jays || 3–0  || Jiménez (7–4) || Johnson (1–4) || Perez (10) || 13,640 || 47–43
|-  style=text-align:center; bgcolor="#ffbbbb"
| 91 || July 10 || Blue Jays || 5–4  || Wagner (2–3) || Hill (0–1) || Delabar (1) || 14,134 || 47–44
|-  style=text-align:center; bgcolor="#bbffbb"
| 92 || July 11 || Blue Jays || 4–2  || Salazar (1–0) || Dickey (8–10) || Perez (11) || 20,641 || 48–44
|-  style=text-align:center; bgcolor="bbffbb"
| 93 || July 12 || Royals || 3–0  || Kluber (7–5) || Collins (2–4) || Allen (2) || 24,077 || 49–44
|-  style=text-align:center; bgcolor="bbffbb"
| 94 || July 13 || Royals || 5–3  || Kazmir (5–4) || Guthrie (8–7) || Perez (12) || 29,740 || 50–44
|-  style=text-align:center; bgcolor="bbffbb"
| 95 || July 14 || Royals || 6–4  || Hill (1–1) || Collins (2–5) || Perez (13) || 15,432 || 51–44
|-  style=text-align:center; bgcolor="#ffbbbb"
| 96 || July 19 || @ Twins || 3–2  || Fien (2–2) || Smith (4–1) || Perkins (22) || 36,280 || 51–45
|-  style=text-align:center; bgcolor="#ffbbbb"
| 97 || July 20 || @ Twins || 3–2  || Correia (7–6) || Hill (1–2) || Perkins (23) || 38,626 || 51–46
|-  style=text-align:center; bgcolor="bbffbb"
| 98 || July 21 || @ Twins || 7–1  || Masterson (11–7) || Diamond (5–9) || || 31,753 || 52–46
|-  style=text-align:center; bgcolor="#ffbbbb"
| 99 || July 22 || @ Mariners || 2–1  || Harang (5–8) || Jiménez (7–5) || Wilhemsen (22) || 18,000 || 52–47
|-  style=text-align:center; bgcolor="#ffbbbb"
| 100 || July 23 || @ Mariners || 4–3  || Ramírez (1–0) || McAllister (4–6) || Wilhelmsen (23) || 16,308
|| 52–48
|-  style=text-align:center; bgcolor="bbffbb"
| 101 || July 24 || @ Mariners || 10–1 ||Kazmir (6–4) ||Saunders (9–9) || || 25,688
|| 53–48
|-  style=text-align:center; bgcolor="bbffbb"
| 102 || July 26 || Rangers || 11–8 (11) || Shaw (1–2) ||Frasor (0–2) || || 27,419 || 54–48
|-  style=text-align:center; bgcolor="bbffbb"
| 103 || July 27 || Rangers || 1–0  || Masterson (12–7) || Darvish (9–5) || Perez (14) || 24,422 || 55–48
|-  style=text-align:center; bgcolor="bbffbb"
| 104 || July 28 || Rangers || 6–0  || Jiménez (8–5) || Ogando (8–5) || || 19,673 || 56–48
|-  style=text-align:center; bgcolor="bbffbb"
| 105 || July 29 || White Sox || 3–2  || Perez (3–1) || Troncoso (1–3) || || 14,868 || 57–48
|-  style=text-align:center; bgcolor="bbffbb"
| 106 || July 30 || White Sox || 7–4  || Shaw (2–2) || Veal (1–2) || Perez (15) || 16,437 || 58–48
|-  style=text-align:center; bgcolor="bbffbb"
| 107 || July 31 || White Sox || 6–5  (10) || Perez (4–1) || Axelrod (4–1) || || 22,258 || 59–48
|-

|-  style=text-align:center; bgcolor="bbffbb"
| 108 || August 1 || White Sox || 6–1  || Masterson (13–7) || Sale (6–11) || || 20,189 || 60–48
|-  style=text-align:center; bgcolor="ffbbbb"
| 109 || August 2 || @ Marlins || 0–10 || Fernández (8–5) || Jiménez (8–6) || || 17,731 || 60–49
|-  style=text-align:center; bgcolor="bbffbb"
| 110 || August 3 || @ Marlins || 4–3  || Allen (5–1) || Jennings (1–2) || Perez (16) || 22,997 || 61–49
|-  style=text-align:center; bgcolor="bbffbb"
| 111 || August 4 || @ Marlins || 2–0  || Kazmir (7–4) || Eovaldi (2–2) || Perez (17) || 25,077 || 62–49
|-  style=text-align:center; bgcolor="ffbbbb"
| 112 || August 5 || Tigers || 2–4  || Alburquerque (2–2) || Perez (4–2) || Benoit (13) || 24,381 || 62–50
|-  style=text-align:center; bgcolor="ffbbbb"
| 113 || August 6 || Tigers || 1–5  || Verlander (12–8) || Masterson (13–8) || || 24,676 || 62–51
|-  style=text-align:center; bgcolor="ffbbbb"
| 114 || August 7 || Tigers || 5–6  (14) || Bonderman (2–3) || Shaw (2–3) || Benoit (14) || 20,169 || 62–52
|-  style=text-align:center; bgcolor="ffbbbb"
| 115 || August 8 || Tigers || 3–10 || Scherzer (17–1) || McAllister (4–7) || || 25,131 || 62–53
|-  style=text-align:center; bgcolor="ffbbbb"
| 116 || August 9 || Angels || 2–5  || Weaver (7–5) || Kazmir (7–5) || De La Rosa (1) || 28,729 || 62–54
|-  style=text-align:center; bgcolor="ffbbbb"
| 117 || August 10 || Angels || 2–7  || Wilson (12–6) || Jiménez (8–7) || || 32,733 || 62–55
|-  style=text-align:center; bgcolor="bbffbb"
| 118 || August 11 || Angels || 6–5  || M. Albers (3–1) || Gutiérrez (0–3) || Perez (18) || 23,433 || 63–55
|-  style=text-align:center; bgcolor="ffbbbb"
| 119 || August 12 || @ Twins || 0–3  || A. Albers (2–0) || Salazar (1–1) || || 30,922 || 63–56
|-  style=text-align:center; bgcolor="bbffbb"
| 120 || August 13 || @ Twins || 5–2  || McAllister (5–7) || Deduno (7–6) || Perez (19) || 29,806 || 64–56
|-  style=text-align:center; bgcolor="bbffbb"
| 121 || August 14 || @ Twins || 9–8  (12) || Perez (5–2) || Pressly (3–3) || Smith (2) || 35,133 || 65–56
|-  style=text-align:center; bgcolor="ffbbbb"
| 122 || August 16 || @ Athletics || 2–3  || Doolittle (4–4) || Masterson (13–9) || Balfour (31) || 17,491 || 65–57
|-  style=text-align:center; bgcolor="bbffbb"
| 123 || August 17 || @ Athletics || 7–1  || Jiménez (9–7) || Straily (6–7) || || 35,067 || 66–57
|-  style=text-align:center; bgcolor="ffbbbb"
| 124 || August 18 || @ Athletics || 3–7  || Otero (2–0) || Kazmir (7–6) || || 21,114 || 66–58
|-  style=text-align:center; bgcolor="bbffbb"
| 125 || August 19 || @ Angels || 5–2  || McAllister (6–7) || Weaver (7–7) || || 36,574 || 67–58
|-  style=text-align:center; bgcolor="bbffbb"
| 126 || August 20 || @ Angels || 4–1  (14) || Carrasco (1–4) || Blanton (2–14) || || 36,421 || 68–58
|-  style=text-align:center; bgcolor="bbffbb"
| 127 || August 21 || @ Angels || 3–1  || Masterson (14–9) || Williams (5–10) || Perez (20) || 35,810 || 69–58
|-  style=text-align:center; bgcolor="ffbbbb"
| 128 || August 23 || Twins || 1–5  || Deduno (8–7) || Jiménez (9–8) || || 23,218 || 69–59
|-  style=text-align:center; bgcolor="bbffbb"
| 129 || August 24 || Twins || 7–2  || McAllister (7–7) || Hendriks (0–2) || || 26,870 || 70–59
|-  style=text-align:center; bgcolor="bbffbb"
| 130 || August 25 || Twins || 3–1  || Smith (5–1) || Burton (2–7) || Perez (21) || 21,042 || 71–59
|-  style=text-align:center; bgcolor="ffbbbb"
| 131 || August 27 || @ Braves || 0–2  || Wood (3–2) ||  Salazar (1–2)|| Kimbrel (42) || 21,400 || 71–60
|-  style=text-align:center; bgcolor="ffbbbb"
| 132 || August 28 || @ Braves || 2–3  || Kimbrel (3–2) || Smith (5–2) || || 20,804 || 71–61
|-  style=text-align:center; bgcolor="ffbbbb"
| 133 || August 29 || @ Braves || 1–3  || Medlen (11–12) || Jiménez (9–9) || Kimbrel (43) || 22,081 || 71–62
|-  style=text-align:center; bgcolor="ffbbbb"
| 134 || August 30 || @ Tigers || 2–7  (7) || Porcello (11–7) || McAllister (7–8) || Rondón (1) || 37,067 || 71–63
|-  style=text-align:center; bgcolor="ffbbbb"
| 135 || August 31 || @ Tigers || 5–10 || Sánchez (12–7) || Kazmir (7–7) || || 41,272 || 71–64
|-

|-  style=text-align:center; bgcolor="bbffbb"
| 136 || September 1 || @ Tigers || 4–0  || Smith (6–2) || Benoit (4–1) || || 41,557 || 72–64
|-  style=text-align:center; bgcolor="ffbbbb"
| 137 || September 2 || Orioles || 2–7  || Norris (10–10) || Masterson (14–10) || || 15,020 || 72–65
|-  style=text-align:center; bgcolor="bbffbb"
| 138 || September 3 || Orioles || 4–3  || Jiménez (10–9) || Tillman (15–5) || || 9,962 || 73–65
|-  style=text-align:center; bgcolor="bbffbb"
| 139 || September 4 || Orioles || 6–4  || Shaw (3–3) || Gausman (2–4) || Perez (22) || 11,522 || 74–65
|-  style=text-align:center; bgcolor="bbffbb"
| 140 || September 6 || Mets || 8–1  || Kazmir (8–7) || Wheeler (7–4) || || 15,962 || 75–65
|-  style=text-align:center; bgcolor="bbffbb"
| 141 || September 7 || Mets  || 9–4  || Kluber (8–5) || Niese (6–7) || || 21,453 || 76–65
|-  style=text-align:center; bgcolor="ffbbbb"
| 142 || September 8 || Mets || 1–2  || Francisco (1–0) || Perez (5–3) || Hawkins (8) || 13,317|| 76–66
|-  style=text-align:center; bgcolor="bbffbb"
| 143 || September 9 || Royals || 4–3  || Jiménez (11–9) || Santana (8–9) || Perez (23) || 9,794 || 77–66
|-  style=text-align:center; bgcolor="ffbbbb"
| 144 || September 10 || Royals || 3–6  || Guthrie (14–10) || McAllister (7–9) || Holland (41) || 12,615 || 77–67
|-  style=text-align:center; bgcolor="ffbbbb"
| 145 || September 11 || Royals || 2–6  || Shields (11–9) || Kazmir (8–8) || Holland (42) || 12,085 || 77–68
|-  style=text-align:center; bgcolor="bbffbb"
| 146 || September 12 || @ White Sox || 14–3 || Kluber (9–5) || Danks (4–13) || || 14,375|| 78–68
|-  style=text-align:center; bgcolor="bbffbb"
| 147 || September 13 || @ White Sox || 3–1  || Shaw (4–3) || Santiago (4–9) || Perez (24) || 15,533 || 79–68
|-  style=text-align:center; bgcolor="bbffbb"
| 148 || September 14 || @ White Sox || 8–1  || Jiménez (12–9) || Rienzo (2–2) || || 28,024 || 80–68
|-  style=text-align:center; bgcolor="bbffbb"
| 149 || September 15 || @ White Sox || 7–1  || McAllister (8–9) || Sale (11–13) || || 18,631 || 81–68
|-  style=text-align:center; bgcolor="ffbbbb"
| 150 || September 16 || @ Royals || 1–7  || Shields (12–9) || Kazmir (8–9) || || 15,413 ||81–69
|-  style=text-align:center; bgcolor="bbffbb"
| 151 || September 17 || @ Royals || 5–3  || Allen (6–1) || W. Davis (7–11) || Perez (25) || 21,685 ||82–69
|-  style=text-align:center; bgcolor="ffbbbb"
| 152 || September 18 || @ Royals || 2–7  || Chen (8–3) || Salazar (1–3) || || 21,198 ||82–70
|-  style=text-align:center; bgcolor="bbffbb"
| 153 || September 19 || Astros || 2–1  || Shaw (5–3) || R. Cruz (0–2) || || 12,607 ||83–70
|-  style=text-align:center; bgcolor="bbffbb"
| 154 || September 20 || Astros || 2–1  (7) || McAllister (9–9) || Clemens (4–6) || || 26,611 ||84–70
|-  style=text-align:center; bgcolor="bbffbb"
| 155 || September 21 || Astros || 4–1  || Kazmir (9–9) || Clemens (4–6) || || 26,611 ||85–70
|-  style=text-align:center; bgcolor="bbffbb"
| 156 || September 22 || Astros || 9–2  || Kluber (10–5) || Bédard (4–12) || || 26,168 ||86–70
|-  style=text-align:center; bgcolor="bbffbb"
| 157 || September 24 || White Sox || 5–4  || Shaw (6–3) || A. Reed (5–4) || || 21,083 ||87–70
|-  style=text-align:center; bgcolor="bbffbb"
| 158 || September 25 || White Sox || 7–2  || Salazar (2–3) || Axelrod (4–11) || || 30,942 ||88–70
|-  style=text-align:center; bgcolor="bbffbb"
| 159 || September 26 || @ Twins || 6–5  || Shaw (7–3) || Albers (2–5) || || 24,929 ||89–70
|-  style=text-align:center; bgcolor="bbffbb"
| 160 || September 27 || @ Twins || 12–6 || Kluber (11–5) || Hernández (3–3) || || 24,074 ||90–70
|-  style=text-align:center; bgcolor="bbffbb"
| 161 || September 28 || @ Twins || 5–1  || Kazmir (10–9) || De Vries (0–2) || || 30,452 ||91–70
|-  style=text-align:center; bgcolor="bbffbb"
| 162 || September 29 || @ Twins || 5–1  || Jiménez (13–9) || Diamond (6–13) || || 30,935 ||92–70
|-

Player stats

Batting
Note: G = Games played; AB = At bats; R = Runs scored; H = Hits; 2B = Doubles; 3B = Triples; HR = Home runs; RBI = Runs batted in; AVG = Batting average; SB = Stolen bases

Pitching
Note: W = Wins; L = Losses; ERA = Earned run average; G = Games pitched; GS = Games started; SV = Saves; IP = Innings pitched; H = Hits allowed; R = Runs allowed; ER = Earned run average; BB = Walks allowed; K = Strikeouts

Notes/Records
On April 7, Justin Masterson became the third pitcher in Major League history to defeat both reigning Cy Young Award winners in the same season by defeating David Price. He had previously defeated R. A. Dickey on April 2.
On April 20, Jason Giambi homered against the Houston Astros, the last team in baseball he had never done so against.
On May 18, Mark Reynolds drove home Jason Kipnis in extra innings against the Seattle Mariners, who would have been out but Mariners catcher Jesus Montero didn't have his foot on home plate
On May 19, the Indians defeated Félix Hernández and the Seattle Mariners, improving their record to 7–1 against former Cy Young Award winners (Dickey, Price, Halladay, Lee, Colón, Verlander, and Hernández. The only loss was to Peavy.) They became the first team in Major League history to defeat 7 former Cy Young winners before June.
On June 28, the Indians defeated the Chicago White Sox 19–10, only the second time in franchise history (and the first since 1923) the team had scored at least 19 runs twice in one season.
Also on June 28, the Indians and White Sox set the Major League record for longest double header without extra innings, with Game 1 lasting 4 hours, 2 minutes and Game 2 lasting 3 hours, 51 minutes, for a combined time of 7 hours, 53 minutes.
On July 3, Jason Kipnis became the first Indians player to hit an inside-the-park home run since 2010.
On July 6, Jason Kipnis and Justin Masterson were selected for the American League All-Star team. Kipnis was selected as a reserve second baseman, and Masterson as a pitcher. This is both players' first selection. Kipnis went 1–1 with an RBI double, while Masterson did not enter the game.
On July 11, Danny Salazar become the fourth pitcher ever to defeat a reigning Cy Young winner (R. A. Dickey) in his Major League debut.
On July 14, fan Greg Van Niel caught four foul balls at Progressive Field, the odds of which Ideal Seat (a foul ball tracking site) roughly estimated at 1,000,000,000,000 to 1.
On July 29, the Indians set a franchise by scoring first in their 16th consecutive game.
Also on July 29, Jason Giambi became the oldest player in Major League history to hit a walk-off home run, at 42 years and 202 days old.
On July 30, Indians catcher Yan Gomes faced Chicago White Sox pitcher André Rienzo, marking the first time in Major League history that a Brazilian-born hitter faced a Brazilian-born pitcher.
On September 24, Jason Giambi again became the oldest player in Major League history to hit a walk-off home run, at 42 years and 259 days.
On November 13, Terry Francona was named the American League Manager of the Year.

Post-season

American League Wild Card Game

Farm system

References

External links

2013 Cleveland Indians Season Official Site 
2013 Cleveland Indians season at Baseball Reference

Cleveland Guardians seasons
Cleveland
Cleveland Indians